The New Generation Currency (NGC) Series is the name used to refer to Philippine peso banknotes issued since 2010 and coins issued since 2018 (2017 for the five peso coin). The series uses the Myriad and Twentieth Century typefaces.

History of the banknotes

Background 
In 2009, the Bangko Sentral ng Pilipinas announced that it will launch a massive redesign for its banknotes and coins to further enhance security features and to improve durability.

Introduction 
The members of the numismatic committee included Bangko Sentral Deputy Governor Diwa Guinigundo and Dr. Ambeth Ocampo, chairman of the National Historical Institute. Designed by Studio 5 Designs and Design Systemat, the new banknotes' designs features famous Filipinos and iconic natural wonders. Philippine national symbols will be depicted on coins. The BSP started releasing the initial batch of new banknotes in December 2010.  The word used in the bills was "Pilipino" rendered in Baybayin.
On December 16, 2010, the new design for Philippine banknotes were released. The font used for lettering in the banknotes is Myriad, while the numerals are set in the Twentieth Century font.

Duterte banknotes 
On December 16, 2016, BSP announced that they will launch sets of banknotes bearing President Rodrigo Duterte's signature. The BSP initially released five million pieces of the new 20, 50, 100, 500, and 1,000-peso bills with Duterte's signature. As for the 200-pesos bills, only two million pieces were released because of lower demand for this denomination.

Demonetization of the New Design Series 
The New Generation Currency series were the only circulating set of notes since December 30, 2017.

2017 Enhanced Version 
In 2017, the BSP updated the design of the P200 and P1000 NGC series banknotes.

2020 Enhanced Version 
In 2020, the BSP released an improved version of the NGC series. In addition to the security features currently present for five denominations (excluding the P20 banknote), the new banknotes will have an updated security thread and design for all five denominations. The notes also have features for the benefit of the visually impaired.

Polymer banknotes 
In 2021, the BSP announced that it will test run the issuance of polymer banknotes through a limited issuance of 1,000-peso bills during the first half of 2022 as part of a long-term study to move to polymer notes. The banknotes will be printed by Note Printing Australia (NPA), wholly owned subsidiary of the Reserve Bank of Australia (RBA) as result of a government-to-government (G2G) memorandum of understanding between the RBA and the BSP. The Bangko Sentral ng Pilipinas (BSP) will circulate the second polymer banknote, the 500-piso banknote by 2023 after assessing the public’s acceptance of the first 1,000-piso polymer money. However, BSP Governor Felipe Medallastated that the 500-piso polymer banknote is unlikely to be issued in the first half of 2023.

Marcos, Jr. banknotes 
On December 7, 2022, BSP announced the new banknotes bearing the signatures of President Ferdinand Marcos, Jr. and BSP Governor Felipe Medalla. The 2020 BSP logo is now also used on 20, 50, 100, 500, and 1,000-peso (non-polymer version) bills which replaced the 2010 logo that has been in use since the series' launch in December 16, 2010.

History of the coins

Introduction 
On March 26, 2018, the Bangko Sentral ng Pilipinas introduced the New Generation Currency Coin Series which was circulated through banks on March 27. The new series features native Philippine flora. Sentimo denominated coins feature a stylized representation of the Philippine flag on the obverse. Peso denominated coins depict the portraits of renowned national heroes of the Philippines on the obverse. The coins are struck in Nickel-plated steel for all six denominations, in response to the widespread hoarding and melting down of the coins, decreasing the cost of production of minting the coins and address concerns of the discoloration of the coins due to the humid, tropical environment. However, the 10-sentimo coin is not included in this series, because it was removed as a general circulation coin.

In July 2019, the BSP announced plans to replace the ₱20 bill with a ₱20 coin by the 1st quarter of 2020. However, ₱20 bills are still printed in 2020, alongside the enhanced version of the other denominations.

In September 2019, Benjamin Diokno, the current BSP governor, announced that the ₱5 coin, being confused for the ₱1 coin, will have a revised design, featuring a wave edge or scallop shape and enhanced security features. The ₱20 coin, also in the same announcement, received its final designs in the same month and the two coins will be released for circulation in December 2019. The 5-piso coin, however, will have a nonagonal shape, while the 20-piso coin, will be bimetallic and the 20-piso coin will be the second bimetallic coin in circulation after the 10-piso coin of the New Design/BSP series.

Banknotes

Original series

Enhanced (2020) series

Polymer banknote version

Coins

Design

Coins

1 sentimo 
The obverse side of the coin feature the description "Republika ng Pilipinas", the three stars and the sun (stylized representation of the Philippine flag), the denomination, year of minting, and mint mark, and the reverse side of the coin depicts the Xanthostemon verdugonianus (Mangkono), a plant endemic to the Philippines and the current logo of the Bangko Sentral ng Pilipinas. The composition is nickel-plated steel, has diameter of 15 mm, and mass of 1.9 grams.

5 sentimo 
The obverse side of the coin feature the description "Republika ng Pilipinas", the three stars and the sun (stylized representation of the Philippine flag), the denomination, year of minting, and mint mark, and the reverse side of the coin depicts the Hoya pubicalyx (Kapal-kapal baging), a plant endemic to the Philippines and the current logo of the Bangko Sentral ng Pilipinas. The composition is nickel-plated steel, has diameter of 16 mm, and mass of 2.2 grams.

25 sentimo 
The obverse side of the coin feature the description "Republika ng Pilipinas", the three stars and the sun (stylized representation of the Philippine flag), the denomination, year of minting, and mint mark, and the reverse side of the coin depicts the Dillenia philippinensis (Katmon), a plant endemic to the Philippines and the current logo of the Bangko Sentral ng Pilipinas. The composition is nickel-plated steel, has diameter of 20 mm, and mass of 3.6 grams. The size and mass of this coin is the same as the 25 sentimo coin in the BSP Series.

1 piso 
The obverse side of the coin feature the description "Republika ng Pilipinas", José Rizal, a national hero of the Philippines, the denomination, year of minting, and mint mark, and the reverse side of the coin depicts the Vanda sanderiana (Waling-Waling), a plant endemic to the Philippines and the current logo of the Bangko Sentral ng Pilipinas. The composition is nickel-plated steel, has diameter of 23 mm, and mass of 6 grams.

5 piso 
The obverse side of the coin feature the description "Republika ng Pilipinas", Andrés Bonifacio, a national hero of the Philippines, the denomination, year of minting, and mint mark, and the reverse side of the coin depicts the Strongylodon macrobotrys (Tayabak), a plant endemic to the Philippines and the current logo of the Bangko Sentral ng Pilipinas. The composition is nickel-plated steel, has diameter of 25 mm, and mass of 7.4 grams. Due to the confusion of the 5-piso coin bearing similarities with the 1-piso coin (mainly caused by its similar size), the Bangko Sentral ng Pilipinas has reissued the 5-piso coin in a nonagonal (9-sided shape) into circulation on December 17, 2019.

10 piso 
The obverse side of the coin feature the description "Republika ng Pilipinas", Apolinario Mabini, a national hero of the Philippines, the denomination, year of minting, and mint mark, and the reverse side of the coin depicts the Medinilla magnifica (Kapa-kapa), a plant endemic to the Philippines and the current logo of the Bangko Sentral ng Pilipinas. The composition is nickel-plated steel, has diameter of 27 mm, and mass of 8 grams. This is the third edge inscription coin used in the Philippines in common circulation after the 1897 one piso coin which edge is fleur-de-iles and the 50 sentimo coin in 1880–1885 which is inscripted LEY PATRIA REY *** which means "Law, homeland, king".

20 piso 
The 20 piso banknote will be changed into a coin that will be released in December 2019 to solve the overuse of this banknote that only takes a year to replace it with a new banknote based on a research by the University of the Philippines. The Bangko Sentral ng Pilipinas states that the new 20 piso coin lasts for 10 to 15 years, longer than a 20 piso banknote. The 20 peso coin was issued into circulation on December 17, 2019. The coin is bi-metallic, with a bronze-plated steel outer ring and a nickel-plated steel center plug, and is the second bi-metallic coin issued by the Bangko Sentral ng Pilipinas, after the 10 peso coin of the New Design/BSP series. The obverse side of the coin features a portrait of Philippine President Manuel Quezon and the reverse side of the coin depict the Scyphiphora (Nilad), Malacañang Palace, the official residence and workplace of the President of the Philippines and the current logo of the Bangko Sentral ng Pilipinas. One notable feature is the edge inscription, with the initial "BSP" at six angles. This is the fourth edge inscription coin used in the Philippines in common circulation.

Banknotes

20 piso 
Colored orange, the main design on the front of the note features a portrait of Philippine president Manuel L. Quezon along with scenes associated with Quezon, including the declaration of Filipino as the national language of the Philippines and Malacañang Palace, the official residence of the President of the Philippines. The designs on the back of the note depict the Banaue Rice Terraces, the Asian palm civet (Paradoxurus hermaphroditus), and a weave design from the Cordilleras.

50 piso 
Colored red, the main designs shown on the front of the note depict a portrait of Philippine president Sergio Osmeña and images tied to him, one depicting the First Philippine Assembly in 1907 and the other the Leyte Landing. The main designs on the back show Taal Lake, the Giant Trevally (locally known as Maliputo) (Caranx ignobilis) and an embroidery design from Batangas province.

100 piso 
Colored violet, the main designs for this denomination on the front depict a portrait of Philippine president Manuel A. Roxas and images associated with Roxas, including the founding of the Central Bank of the Philippines (Bangko Sentral ng Pilipinas) in 1949 and the Inauguration of the Third Philippine Republic on July 4, 1946. The main designs shown on the back feature the Mayon Volcano, the Whale Shark (locally known as Butanding, scientific name Rhincodon typus) and a weave design from Bicol. The original version, issued from 2010 to 2016, included a blue underprint. Notes issued from 2016 onwards have a strong mauve or violet color, due to complaints that the color of the 100 pesos note is almost indistinguishable from the 1,000 pesos note.

200 piso 
Colored green, the main designs of the front of the note feature a portrait of Philippine president Diosdado P. Macapagal, along with images associated with Macapagal, including the EDSA People Power 2001, the Aguinaldo Shrine in Kawit, Cavite and the Barasoain Church in Malolos, Bulacan. The main designs on the back of the note feature the Chocolate Hills in Bohol, the Philippine tarsier (Tarsius syrichta), and a weave design from the Visayas. The main designs on the front of the note were used from 2010 to 2017. The 2017 issue features images showing the Declaration of Philippine Independence in Kawit, Cavite, and the Opening of the Malolos Congress in Barasoain Church, Malolos, Bulacan.

500 piso 
Colored yellow, the main designs on the front of the note feature the dual portraits of Philippine Senator Benigno Aquino Jr. and his wife, Philippine president Corazon C. Aquino. Also on the front of the note are images associated to the couple, the image of the 1986 People Power Revolution and the Benigno Aquino Jr. monument in Makati. The main designs on the back of the note feature the Subterranean River National Park, the Blue-naped parrot (Tanygnathus lucionensis), and a cloth design from the Southern Philippines.

1,000 piso 

Colored light-blue, the main designs on the front of the note feature the trio portraits of José Abad Santos, Vicente Lim and Josefa Llanes Escoda. Also on the front of the note is an image of the Centennial celebration of Philippine independence. The main designs on the back of the note feature the Tubbataha Reefs Natural Park, the South Sea Pearl (Pinctada maxima), and a cloth design from the Mindanao design for T'nalak (Ikat-dyed abaca). The original issue from 2010 to 2017 featured the Order of Lakandula (erroneously labelled as "Medal of Honor") and its description on the front. Notes issued from 2017 onwards omit both the medal and its description. This April 2022, the BSP in partnership with the Reserve Bank of Australia, will release a limited trial polymer version of the 1000-piso banknote, completely removing the three portraits of the figureheads and instead replacing it with an image of the Philippine Eagle with a clear window of Sampaguita, the national flower of the Philippines. The banknote is also the first to be printed which features the 2020 logo of the Bangko Sentral ng Pilipinas, which has received much criticism from the general public. In an interview, Bangko Sentral ng Pilipinas Governor Benjamin Diokno stated that “The new series will focus on fauna and flora in the Philippines.”

Commemorative banknotes

5,000 piso 
On January 18, 2021, the Bangko Sentral ng Pilipinas issued a non-circulating 5,000 piso banknote in commemoration of the Quincentennial Commemorations in the Philippines, the anniversary of the Victory of Mactan, which Lapulapu vanquished Portuguese conquistador Ferdinand Magellan and his army in their attempt to colonize Mactan.

On its obverse, the banknote depicts a young Lapulapu, an image of the Battle of Mactan, the QCP logo, and the Karakoa, the large outrigger warships used by native Filipinos, while on its reverse shows the Philippine eagle, or the Manaol, which symbolizes clear vision, freedom, and strength; and which embodies the ancient Visayan belief that all living creatures originated from an eagle, also featured are the tree of a coconut, which was food the people of Samar provided to Ferdinand Magellan and his crew; and Mount Apo, which is located in Mindanao, where the circumnavigators finally found directional clues to their intended destination of Maluku or the Spice Island.

This commemorative non-circulating banknote is predominantly brown in color.

References 

Banknotes of the Philippines
Philippines currency history
Portraits on banknotes